The 2018 Carolina Challenge Cup was the 14th edition of the Carolina Challenge Cup, an annual soccer tournament held in Charleston, South Carolina by the Charleston Battery. The tournament ran from February 17 to 24, with all matches played at MUSC Health Stadium in Charleston. 

In addition to the Charleston Battery of the United Soccer League (USL), three Major League Soccer (MLS) clubs participated: Columbus Crew SC and 2017 expansion franchises Atlanta United FC and Minnesota United FC.

Teams

Standings

Matches

See also 
 Carolina Challenge Cup
 Charleston Battery
 2018 in American soccer

References 

2018
2018 in American soccer
2018 in sports in South Carolina
February 2018 sports events in the United States